Montenegro has five national parks which cover approximately 10 percent of the country's territory. The parks are managed by the National Parks of Montenegro government agency.

Regional nature parks

See also 
List of World Heritage Sites in Montenegro

References 

Montenegro
 
Montenegro geography-related lists
National parks